Sandava xylistis, the rusty snout, is a moth of the family Erebidae first described by Charles Swinhoe in 1900. It is found in the Australian states of Victoria and Queensland, New South Wales, Tasmania, South Australia and the Australian Capital Territory.

The wingspan is about 20 mm. The moth flies in October, November, March and April.

References

Hypeninae